Everard is a surname. Notable people with the surname include:

Harriett Everard (1844–1882), English singer and actress
James Everard (born 1962), British Army officer
Thomas Everard (died 1781), mayor of Williamsburg, Virginia
Thomas Everard (1560–1633), English Jesuit